William Tecumsah "Tom" Avery (November 11, 1819 – May 20, 1880) was an American slave owner, politician, member of the United States House of Representatives for the 10th congressional district of Tennessee, and Confederate Army officer.

Biography
Avery was born in Hardeman County, Tennessee on November 11, 1819, the son of Nathan and Rebecca Jones Rivers Avery. He attended the common schools, graduated from old Jackson College near Columbia, Tennessee in Maury County. He studied law and was admitted to the bar. He moved to Memphis, Tennessee in 1840 and engaged in the practice of law. He married Emma Chastelette Jones in December 1852. They had three children, William Thomas, Harry Edwin, and Emma Blythe.

Career
In 1843, Avery was a member of the Tennessee House of Representatives. He was elected as a Democrat to the Thirty-fifth and Thirty-sixth Congress. He served from March 4, 1857 to March 3, 1861,  but he was not a candidate for renomination in 1860.

During the Civil War, Avery served as a lieutenant colonel in the Confederate Army. He was a clerk of the criminal court of Shelby County from 1870 to 1874. He resumed the practice of law in Memphis, Tennessee.

Death
Avery accidentally drowned in Ten Mile Bayou in Crittenden County, Arkansas, opposite Memphis, on May 20, 1880 (age 60 years, 193 days). He is interred at Elmwood Cemetery in Memphis, Tennessee.

References

External links

1819 births
1880 deaths
People from Hardeman County, Tennessee
American people of English descent
Democratic Party members of the United States House of Representatives from Tennessee
Democratic Party members of the Tennessee House of Representatives
American slave owners
Clerks
19th-century American politicians
Confederate States Army officers
People of Tennessee in the American Civil War
Deaths by drowning in the United States
Accidental deaths in Arkansas